Julio León Heredia (born 23 October 1966) is a Venezuelan politician and the current governor of Yaracuy (since 2008). He was the PSUV candidate for the 2008 Venezuelan regional elections, and won comfortably. He succeeded Álex Sánchez, an interim governor appointed after  Carlos E. Giménez was impeached in June 2008 by the Supreme Tribunal of Justice.

León's career in the Venezuelan air force was cut short when León participated in the November 1992 coup attempt against Carlos Andrés Pérez.

References

Living people
1966 births
Governors of Yaracuy
United Socialist Party of Venezuela politicians